Otokar KALE (Turkish for "Fortress") is a Mine-Resistant Ambush Protected Personnel Carrier.

It is manufactured by Otokar Otomotiv ve Savunma Sanayi A.Ş. (simply Otokar),a Turkish military vehicles manufacturer headquartered in headquartered in Sakarya, Turkey.

It was first unveiled in 2014

Design 
Kale provides enhanced mine and ballistic protection against improvised explosive devices (IEDs), as well as small arms fire and shell splinters. The independent suspension system ensuring superior mobility in a wide range of demanding terrains under diverse climatic conditions.  Kale carries up to thirteen people in addition to the driver, commander and gunner.

Kale can be fitted with a protected weapon station (PWS) or RWS armed with a 7.62mm or .50in machine gun, plus banks of 76mm grenade launchers.

References 

Military vehicles of Turkey